Richard Comito (February 11, 1939 – January 5, 2014) was an American politician who served in the Iowa Senate from the 17th district from 1979 to 1983.

He died on January 5, 2014, in Waterloo, Iowa at age 74.

References

1939 births
2014 deaths
Republican Party Iowa state senators